AMEE may refer to:
Africa, Middle East, and Eastern Europe
Association for Medical Education In Europe
Autonomous Mapping Evaluation and Evasion, a robot in the 2000 film Red Planet
Avoiding Mass Extinctions Engine in climate change
Amee (singer), a Vietnamese singer belonging to St.319 Entertainment